The light from white LED lamps and LED strip lights is usually provided by industry standard surface-mounted device LEDs (SMD LEDs). Non-SMD types of LED lighting also exist, such COB (chip on board) and MCOB (multi-COB).

Surface-mounted device LED modules are described by the dimensions of the LED package. A single multicolor module may have three individual LEDs within that package, one each of red, green and blue, to allow many colors or shades of white to be selected, by varying the brightness of the individual LEDs. LED brightness may be increased by using a higher driving current, at the cost of reducing the device's lifespan.

References

Electronic design
Electronics manufacturing
LED lamps